Boardley is an unincorporated community in King and Queen County, Virginia, United States.

References
GNIS reference

Unincorporated communities in Virginia
Unincorporated communities in King and Queen County, Virginia